Nyala Airport is an airport in Nyala, Sudan . United Nations peacekeeping force UNAMID uses a separated terminal in Nyala Airport.

Airlines and destinations

Nyala Air Base

Nyala Airport hosts two Sudanese Air Force units:
 Helicopter Squadrons (Mil Mi-8, Mil Mi-24, Mil Mi-35)
 Transport Squadron (Antonov An-32)

References

External links

Airports in Sudan